Hellinga is a surname. Notable people with the surname include:

 Gerben Hellinga Jr (born 1938), Dutch author of science-fiction and historic novels
 Lotte Hellinga (born 1932), book historian and expert on printing
 Wytze Hellinga (1908–1985), Dutch linguist
 Wilco Hellinga (born 1970), Dutch footballer

Dutch-language surnames